Radial artery puncture is a medical procedure performed to obtain a sample of arterial blood for gas analysis. A needle is inserted into the radial artery and spontaneously fills with blood. The syringe is either prepacked with a small amount of heparin to prevent coagulation, or must be heparinised, by drawing up a small amount of heparin and squirting it out again.

References

Vascular procedures